AHC Dunărea Călărași 2014 is a handball club from Călărași, Romania, that plays in the Romanian Handball League.

Kits

Team

Current squad 
Squad for the 2020-2021 season

Staff tehnic
   Gabriel Armanu  (30.12.1972.Bacau)
   Eremia Piriianu  (16.10.1975.Constanta)
   Florin Iuliu Dima  (5.04.1963.Brasov)
Goalkeepers
   Artsem Padasinau  (4.01.1989.Gomel / Belarus)
   Vlad Dumitru Rusu  (27.04.1998.Moinesti)
   Cristian Balasa  (9.04.2001.Calarasi)
   Eugen Stefan Nicolae Craciunescu  (16.04.1999. Curtea de Arges)
Wingers
RW
   Gabriel Bujor (8.11.1990.Tecuci)
   Ionuț Broască  (8.02.1998.Braila)
   Nicolae Ilies Costea  (20.07.2002.Calarasi)
LW
   Florin Ovidiu Dospinescu  (23.03.1996.Piatra Neamt)
   Cătălin Sabin Costea  (31.071995,Baia Mare)
Line players
   Dragoș Soare  (23.07.1989.Ploiesti)
   Gabriel Florinel Dumitru  (30.01.1996.Galati)
   Daniel Panait  (6.04.2000.Calarasi)
   Bogdan Marian Păunescu  (3.08.1995.Calarasi)

Back players
LB
   Dragos Hanțaru (24.04.1998.Vaslui)
   Amin Yusefinezhad  (19.01.1996, Iran)
CB
   Mihai Sebastian Bujor (8.11.1990.Tecuci)
   Andrei Valeriu Dragan  (6.07.1999.Sf Gheorghe.Covasna)
RB
   Aleksii Ganchev  (28.08.1986,Zaporozhye / Ucraina)
   Alexios Karympov  (3.05.1996.Astrahan / Rusia)

Transfers

Transfers for the 2020-21 season 

Joining
    Amin Yousefinezhand (Iran)
   Artsem Padasinau  (4.01.1989.Gomel / Belarus)
   Aleksey Ganchev  (28.08.1986,Zaporozhye / Ucraina)
   Andrei Dragan 
   Eugen Craciunescu 
   Alexyos Karimpov  (Grecia)
   Nicolae Ilies Costea  (20.07.2002 / Calarasi)
Leaving
  Victor Vartic (CSA Steaua Bucuresti)
  Roman Zacaciurin (AHC Potaissa Turda)
  George Șelaru (AHC Potaissa Turda)
  Bogdan Moisa (CSM Fagaras)
  Ionut Rotaru (AHC Dobrogea Sud Constanta/ CSM Bacau)
  Mihai Marcel Sandu 
  Mihajlo Radojković (Serbia)

  Florin Dospinescu (CSM Reșița)
  Dragoș Hanțaru (CS Dinamo București)
  Ionuț Broască (CS HC Buzău)
  Gabriel Dumitriu (AHC Potaissa Turda)
  Vlăduț Dumitru Rusu (CSM Bacău)
  Gabriel Bujor (CSM Bacău)
  Mihai Sebastian Bujor (CSM Bacău)
  Andrei Valeriu Drăgan (CSM Focșani)

Notable coaches
  Aihan Omer
  Ioan Bucur Bota
  Caslav Dincic
  Florin Nicolae
  Adrian Dănuț Petrea
  Serhiy Bebeshko
  Igor Rapovers
  Eremia Rică Pîrîianu
  Gabriel Armanu

External links 

 https://actualitateacalarasi.ro/s-a-infiintat-asociatia-handbal-club-dunarea-calarasi-2014/
 https://frh.ro/clasament.php?id=475
 https://handbalmania.ro/sectiune/handbal-masculin/liga-zimbrilor/
 https://www.handbalvolei.ro/team/ahc-dunarea-calarasi/

Romanian handball clubs
Călărași
Handball clubs established in 2014
2014 establishments in Romania
Liga Națională (men's handball)

https://www.prosport.ro/alte-sporturi/handbal/bursa-transferurilor-in-handbal-masculin-dinamo-si-minaur-baia-mare-au-facut-achizitii-de-la-echipe-din-liga-campionilor-19037148